Hypericum afrum is a perennial herb in the genus Hypericum, in the section Adenosepalum, subsect. Aethiopicum.

References

afrum